In mathematics, the quarter periods K(m) and iK ′(m) are special functions that appear in the theory of elliptic functions.

The quarter periods K and iK ′ are given by

and

When m is a real number, 0 < m < 1, then both K and K ′ are real numbers.  By convention, K is called the real quarter period and iK ′ is  called the imaginary quarter period.  Any one of the numbers m, K, K ′, or K ′/K uniquely determines the others.

Notation 

The quarter periods are essentially the elliptic integral of the first kind, by making the substitution . This notational difference has spawned a terminology to go with it:
  is called the parameter
  is called the complementary parameter
  is called the elliptic modulus
  is called the complementary elliptic modulus, where 
  the modular angle, where 
  the complementary modular angle.  Note that

The elliptic modulus can be expressed in terms of the quarter periods as

and

The nome  is given by

The complementary nome is given by

The real quarter period can be expressed as a Lambert series involving the nome:

Additional expansions and relations can be found on the page for elliptic integrals.

References
 Milton Abramowitz and Irene A. Stegun (1964), Handbook of Mathematical Functions, Dover Publications, New York. . See chapters 16 and 17.

Elliptic functions